Tityus tenuicauda is a species of scorpions in the family Buthidae. This species is endemic to the island of Trinidad in Trinidad and Tobago.

References

Endemic fauna of Trinidad and Tobago
Animals described in 2001
tenuicauda